Nemojov is a municipality and village in Trutnov District in the Hradec Králové Region of the Czech Republic. It has about 800 inhabitants.

Administrative parts
The municipality is made up of village parts of Dolní Nemojov, Horní Nemojov and Nový Nemojov, and the village of Starobucké Debrné.

References

Villages in Trutnov District